First Methodist Church of Rockwall is a historic church at 303 E. Rusk in Rockwall, Texas. Built in 1913, it was added to the National Register of Historic Places in 2007.

See also

National Register of Historic Places listings in Rockwall County, Texas
Recorded Texas Historic Landmarks in Rockwall County

References

Methodist churches in Texas
Churches on the National Register of Historic Places in Texas
Churches completed in 1913
20th-century Methodist church buildings in the United States
Buildings and structures in Rockwall County, Texas
1913 establishments in Texas
National Register of Historic Places in Rockwall County, Texas